Eilema costipuncta is a moth of the subfamily Arctiinae first described by John Henry Leech in 1890. It is found in China and Taiwan.

References

Moths described in 1890
costipuncta